Jan Očko of Vlašim (Jan VIII as the Bishop of Olomouc) (? – died 1380), from the family of the House of Vlašim, was the second Archbishop of Prague (1364–1378). He was the uncle to his successor Jan of Jenštejn.

Biography

Early life
It is not known when he was born. His father was Jan of Kamenice, the secretary of the King John of Bohemia. His brothers were Michael of Vlašim, Burgrave of Svojanov, and Pavel of Vlašim and Jenštejn, Grand Chamberlain.

Bishop
As of 1351, Jan Očko was the Bishop of Olomouc. His coat of arms was that of bishop and silver two Vulture heads gules (common with of Vlašim and Jenštejn).

At that time, he became an advisor to Charles IV. He later accompanied Charles IV on his way to Italy in 1355. On 12 July 1364, he became the Archbishop of Prague, succeeding the dead Arnošt of Pardubice.

In 1368, he was regent of the Kingdom of Bohemia.

He consecrated the Church of Saint Thomas in Brno (13 March 1356) and the Emmaus monastery in Prague on 29 March 1372.

In 1366 he ordered the incarceration of Jan Milíč z Kroměříže for his preachings against Charles IV, whom he called the "Antichrist". Jan Milíč was later freed by Charles and remained in his favour.

Cardinal
On 18 September 1378, by nomination of Pope Urban VI, he became the first Bohemian named a Cardinal. On 30 November 1379, he abandoned the post of Archbishop.  According to Konrad Eubel, Joannes de Jenzenstein was appointed to succeed him on 19 March 1379.

He was the bailor of the castle Kašperk.

Death
He died on 14 January 1380.

See also
Vlašim family
The Votive Panel of Jan Očko of Vlašim

References

Further reading

Roman Catholic archbishops of Prague
Czech cardinals
14th-century Roman Catholic archbishops in the Holy Roman Empire
1380 deaths
Year of birth unknown
People from Vlašim